The United States Senate Environment and Public Works Subcommittee on Private Sector and Consumer Solutions to Global Warming and Wildlife Protection was one of six subcommittees of the Senate Committee on Environment and Public Works during the 110th Congress. The subcommittee's jurisdiction included:

Global warming
Fisheries and wildlife, including the Fish and Wildlife Service
Endangered Species Act (ESA)
National Wildlife Refuges

The subcommittee was formerly known as the Subcommittee on Fisheries, Wildlife, and Water, but was renamed during committee organization of the 110th Congress when global warming was added to its oversight responsibilities.  It served as a counterpart to the new Subcommittee on Public Sector Solutions to Global Warming, Oversight, and Children's Health Protection.

The subcommittee was chaired by Senator Joe Lieberman of Connecticut, and the ranking member was Senator John Warner of Virginia.

Members, 110th Congress

See also

References

Environment and Public Works Senate Private Sector and Consumer Solutions to Global Warming and Wildlife Protection
Environment of the United States